Asphaltite (also known as uintahite, asphaltum, gilsonite or oil sands) is a naturally occurring soluble solid hydrocarbon, a form of asphalt (or bitumen) with a relatively high melting temperature. Its large-scale production occurs in the Uintah Basin of Utah and Colorado, United States. Although the substance has been historically mined in the Uintah Basin, resources are being discovered and mined more recently in other countries such as Colombia and Iran. Gilsonite is mined in underground shafts and resembles shiny black obsidian.
Discovered in the 1860s, it was first marketed as a lacquer, electrical insulator, and waterproofing compound approximately 25 years later by Samuel H. Gilson.

History
Gilsonite was discovered in the 1860s. By 1888 Samuel H. Gilson had started a company to mine the substance, but soon discovered the vein was on the Uintah and Ouray Indian Reservation. Gilsonite mining became the first large commercial enterprise in the Uintah Basin, causing most of its early population growth.

Mining gilsonite during World War II was manual, using a six-pound pick, then shoveling the ore into 200 pound sacks, which were sewn by hand. In 1949 at the Pariette Gilsonite mine near Myton, Utah, Reed Smoot McConkie set the world record for ore mined by hand. Using his pick and shovel, he mined 175 bags of ore in eight hours, 950 bags in a six-day week, 1925 bags in a month and 15,000 bags in one year.

Gilsonite-brand uintahite's earliest applications included paints for buggies and emulsions for beer-vat lining. It was used by Ford Motor Company as a principal component of the japan black lacquer used on most of the Ford Model T cars.

Composition
Gilsonite is categorized as a soluble material in oil solutions such as carbon disulphide or TCE (trichloroethylene). A major component of gilsonite is carbon; it also contains several other elements including nitrogen and sulfur and some volatile compounds.

Reserves and uses
Gilsonite reserves are distributed globally, especially within basins. It has also been found on the dwarf planet Ceres and is predicted to exist on the Martian moon Phobos.

Gilsonite is used in more than 160 products, primarily in dark-colored printing inks and paints, oil well drilling muds and cements, asphalt modifiers, foundry sand additives, and a wide variety of chemical products. The trademark, registered in 1921, belongs to the American Gilsonite Company which filed for bankruptcy and after accepting re-organization seems to emerge from it at Jan 3rd 2017. 

A common application of gilsonite is in bitumen blending. This application is practised in countries such as China, India and Iran. Known as asfaltit in Turkish, it is burnt in Silopi, a coal fired power station in Turkey.

References

External links
Uintahite on Mindat

Organic minerals
Asphalt